The Gotland National Conscription was a Swedish Army infantry unit that traced its origins back to the 19th century. It was split into two new regiments in 1887. The regiment's soldiers were recruited on the island of Gotland.

History
Gotland National Conscription was raised in 1811 through an agreement, a convention between the people of Gotland and the king. It became Sweden's first military conscript defence with exercise duty even in peacetime. It mobilized nearly 20% of the population and raised four battalions in addition to artillery. The officers were appointed by the King; non-commissioned officers were elected by the men. In 1887, the Gotland National Conscriptio was reformed into two separate units, the Gotland Infantry Regiment and the Gotland Artillery Corps.

Organisation 1861

Northern battalion (which in 1870 consisted of 5,040 men) consisted of the following companies:
Fårö company: Fårö socken
Rute company: Rute, Fleringe and Bunge socken
Forsa company: Lärbro, Hellvi and Tingstäde
Bals company: Othem, Boge, Hejnum and Bäl
Lina company: Hörsne, Bara, Gothem and Norrlanda
Stenkyrka company: Stenkyrka, Hangvar and Hall
Lummelunds company: Martebo, Lummelunda and Väskinde
Halla kompani: Dalhem, Ganthem and Halla

Visby battalion (which in 1870 consisted of 1,690 men) consisted of the following companies:
Visby jäger company
Visby infantry company
Endre company: Endre, Hejdeby, Barlingbo and Ekeby
Dede company: Roma, Björke, Follingbo and Akebäck
Bro company: Bro, Fole, Lokrume, Källunge and Vallstena
Stenkumla company: Stenkumla, Västerhejde, Träkumla, Vall and Hogrän
Eskelhems company: Eskelhem and Tofta

Middle battalion (which in 1870 consisted of 1,730 men) consisted of the following companies:
Sanda (Banda) company: Sanda, Västergarn and Mästerby
Klinte company: Klinte and Fröjel
Hejde company: Hejde, Väte and Atlingbo
Sjonhems company: Sjonhem, Viklau, Vänge, Buttle and Guldrupe
Östergarns company: Östergarn, Gammelgarn and Ardre
Thorsburgs company: Kräklingbo, Ala and Anga
Garda company: Garda, Etelhem, Alskog and Lye

Southern battalion (which in 1870 consisted of 2,350 men) consisted of the following companies:
Närs kompani: När and Lau
Burs kompani: Burs and Stånga
Fardhems kompani: Fardhem, Linde, Lojsta, Levide and Gerum
Hablingbo kompani: Hablingbo, Silte, Eksta and Sproge
Hemse kompani: Alva, Hemse, Rone and Eke
Havdhems kompani: Havdhem and Näs
Gröttlinge kompani: Grötlingbo and Fide
Hoburgs kompani: Öja, Hamra, Vamlingbo and Sundre

The number of conscripts amounted to 8,496 men and the officer corps comprised 111 men. The state cost for the conscripts amounted to 139,562 riksdaler and 92 öre, of which the military accounted for 2,000.

Commanding officers

The Military Commanders of Gotland from 1811 to 1886. After Lennart Reuterskiöld's withdrawal as military commander the post of Military Commander and County Governor came to be united until 1873, then the posts were separated into two. Both Rudolf Cederström and Lennart Reuterskiöld were Military Commander and Deputy County Governor.

1810-08-22 – 1811-11-03: Rudolf Cederström
1811-11-03 – 1812-08-31: Lennart Reuterskiöld
1812-08-31 – 1817-03-26: Carl Fredric Aschling
1817-03-26 – 1831-06-30: Jacob Cederström
1831-06-30 – 1849-11-23: Michael Silvius von Hohenhausen
1849-11-23 – 1858-07-17: Gustaf Jacob af Dalström
1858-07-17 – 1862-05-13: Gillis Bildt
1862-05-13 – 1873-09-20: Henrik Gyllenram
1873-09-20 – 1884-04-09: Ernst von Vegesack
1884-04-09 – 1895-07-29: Herman von Hohenhausen

See also
List of Swedish regiments

Footnotes

References

Notes

Print

Infantry units and formations of the Swedish Army
Disbanded units and formations of Sweden
Military units and formations established in 1811
Military units and formations disestablished in 1887
Visby Garrison
1811 establishments in Sweden
1887 disestablishments in Sweden